Auro 11.1 is one of the cinematic speaker layouts of the Auro-3D format, invented in 2005 by Wilfried Van Baelen (CEO Auro Technologies, CEO Galaxy Studios). The Auro 11.1 cinema audio format is supported by Barco, a global visualization technology and digital cinema projection company.

Working

The Auro 11.1 cinema sound format is an extension of the existing 5.1 surround sound format by incorporating height and overhead channels to allow for placement and panning of sound in the horizontal and vertical axis.

Auro 11.1 is a channel-based system and thus differs in capability compared to competing formats such as Dolby Atmos and DTS:X. The height layer allows for placement of background reflections and reverberations observed in nature as well as allowing for smooth panning from the base layer to the ceiling. However, the lack of a surround back-channel restricts panning due to lack of differentiation between the side and rear sector. Similarly, the use of arrays for surround and overhead channel also disallows pinpoint localization of sound along the walls as well as within the theater space. The Auromax format extends the capabilities of Auro 11.1 to approach Dolby Atmos and DTS:X.

The system uses Auro-3D Octopus codec, which allows the 12 channels to be compressed into 6 channels by utilizing the least significant bits for the additional channels and its metadata. This allows Auro 11.1 to be played as 5.1 in the absence of a decoder.

The first Auro 11.1 system was installed in May 2010 in Galaxy Studios and the format was launched at the spatial audio conference (AES) in October 2010 in Tokyo. By December 2014, 550 installations were committed and installed in theaters worldwide.

The first movie mixed in Auro 11.1 was Lucasfilm's Red Tails, released in January 2012. On 1 November 2012, DreamWorks Animation announced that it would release 15 of its upcoming movies in the Auro 11.1 format.

Products
The Auro 11.1 technological suite contains the Auro-Codec encoding - decoding plugins, Auro-Matic upmixer plugin and the Auro-Panner plugin.

The Auro 11.1 decoder
The Auro 11.1 decoder is a firmware based solution compatible with Doremi cinema servers, that activates once the metadata in an Auro 11.1 stream is detected. Once decoded, the media block routes the channels to the AP243D audio processor.

AP243D audio processor
The AP243D audio processor renders the streams received from the decoder and allows switching between 6 and 12 channel playback automatically or upmixing to Auro 11.1 layout.

Films released in Auro 11.1
Sources:

References

External links
 Auro 11.1 webpage
 Auro Technologies webpage
 Katzenberg throws DreamWorks weight behind Barco 3D sound webpage
 RED TAILS to Play in Auro-3D 11.1 Surround Sound in Select Locations webpage
 DreamWorks Animation pacts for Auro-3D sound webpage
 DreamWorks Animation Partners With Barco webpage
 Jilla to release in Auro 1.11 webpage

Sound technology
Surround sound